Calonectria pteridis is a fungal plant pathogen. It is native to North America. It exclusively lives on the leaves of the Polystichum adiantiforme, Dryopteris normalis and of Nephrolepis exaltata plants. The name is synonymous with Cylindrocladium pteridis.

References

Fungal plant pathogens and diseases
Nectriaceae
Fungi described in 1926
Fungi of North America